Action for Healthy Kids is a nationwide grassroots network mobilizing school professionals, families and communities to take actions that support the health of the whole child. Founded in 2002, the organization is committed to addressing the root causes of the current child health crisis and focuses on increasing access to healthy foods and physical activity, supporting social emotional learning, and engaging parents, caregivers and community members to transform student health, well-being and learning. Former U.S. Surgeon General David Satcher is the founding chair of the organization. Through funding opportunities and programmatic support, Action for Healthy Kids provides schools all the information and resources they need to implement successful and sustainable school health programs.

Action for Healthy Kids is the organizational home of Active Schools, formerly known as Let's Move! Active Schools, a collective impact movement of public and private sector partner organizations working to prioritize physical education and physical activity in schools.

With support from companies such as Aldi, Cargill, CSX Transportation, DOLE, Kellogg's, Nike, Materne North America and Saputo and through partnerships with Active Schools, CATCH Global Foundation, the National School Wellness District Coalition and many others. Action for Healthy Kids is able to support over 140,000 school health champions and more than 50,000 schools across the United States.

References

External links 
 Action for Healthy Kids official website.

Non-profit organizations based in Illinois
Youth organizations based in Illinois
Children's health-related organizations
Organizations established in 2002
2002 establishments in Illinois